Şermin Langhoff (born in 1969) theater producer based in Germany who immigrated from Turkey as a child. She is director of the Maxim Gorki Theater.

References

1969 births
Turkish emigrants to West Germany
Turkish theatre directors
German theatre directors
Living people
Turkish people of Greek descent
German people of Greek descent
Turkish people of Circassian descent
German people of Circassian descent
People from Edremit, Balıkesir
People from Nuremberg